Red Patent Leather is a live album by the American rock and roll group New York Dolls, released in 1984. It was recorded in New York a decade earlier, in March 1975, just a month before the group broke up while on tour in Florida.

Background 
The New York performance was recorded at the "Little Hippodrome" club. The shows were the last performed by the classic line-up in New York, and as such, they made the small, unusual venue famous. The venue itself closed later that same year. The entire show was included in the From Here To Eternity box set, featuring the tracks on disc 3.

Band performances were rare at the "Little Hippodrome", a drag and comedy club which was located at 227 East 56th Street, between Second and Third Avenues. The club was named after the Hippodrome Theatre, a nearby landmark Theater District building in Midtown Manhattan that had been torn down in 1939.

The group dressed in red for the show and decorated the club with a faux communist red theme, and dubbed the event 'Red Patent Leather' in their press release, which explained: "This show is in coordination with the Dolls' very special 'entente cordiale' with the People's Republic of China."

The press release also claimed that the intended backdrop behind the stage would even include "a huge red flag bearing the hammer and sickle"

Songs 
Several "new" songs being played by the Dolls at this stage in their career would show up on later solo records. The song "Pirate Love" would later be recorded by Johnny Thunders' next band The Heartbreakers on their debut. "Down, Down Downtown" would be recorded as "Downtown" on Thunder's solo debut So Alone. "Girls" would be recorded by David Johansen for his  solo debut. "Teenage News" would be recorded by Sylvain Sylvain for his solo debut. The band were going to record "Teenage News" as a single in October 1974 at Record Plant East but only Johansen and Sylvain showed up in a condition to record (Thunders did not appear at all). Thus, it is likely that some of the songs on this album would have been on the band's third studio album had they made one.

Track listing

Personnel
New York Dolls
David Johansen - vocals, harmonica
Johnny Thunders - lead guitar, backing vocals, lead vocals on 8 & 14
Sylvain Sylvain - rhythm guitar, electric piano on 7, 8, & 10, lead vocals on 5
Arthur "Killer" Kane - bass
Peter Jordan - second bass
Jerry Nolan - drums

References

New York Dolls albums
Live punk rock albums
1984 live albums